Paul Weldon is a Canadian musician architect and graphic artist from Toronto, Ontario.

Weldon was a founding member of the Canadian band Edward Bear, which had Top 5 hits in Canada and charted well in the United States. and worldwide. Weldon was a keyboardist and bass player for Edward Bear, and that band's '70s albums featured his cover art.  Weldon continues to play in the Toronto area .

Weldon's work designing album art spans over 30 years and several genres including classic rock, 70s funk, and modern cult-indie rock.  Weldon designed a large percentage of the album covers released in Canada between 1971 and 1974.  Weldon's work includes cover art for the 1972 release of Funkadelic's America Eats Its Young.  His cover work for Rush's 1974 eponymous debut album would lead, thirty years later, to the Rush-influenced NYC indie-rockers The Negatones commissioning Weldon to do the cover art for their 2005 eponymous debut LP, which bears a similarity to the original Rush record.

Weldon's designs often incorporates found materials (comic book clippings, dollar bills, science photos).

References

External links
 [ Paul Weldon's Allmusic Page]

Canadian graphic designers
Living people
Year of birth missing (living people)